Death Before Dishonor XV was the 15th Death Before Dishonor professional wrestling pay-per-view (PPV) event produced by Ring of Honor (ROH), which took place on September 22, 2017, at Sam's Town Live in Sunrise Manor, Nevada.

Wrestlers from New Japan Pro-Wrestling (NJPW)—with which ROH has a partnership—also will appear on the card. The event also marks Minoru Suzuki's first appearance in the United States in 25 years.

Storylines
Death Before Dishonor XV will feature professional wrestling matches, involving different wrestlers from pre-existing scripted feuds, plots, and storylines that played out on ROH's television programs. Wrestlers portrayed villains or heroes as they followed a series of events that built tension and culminated in a wrestling match or series of matches.

Results

See also
2017 in professional wrestling
List of Ring of Honor pay-per-view events

References

External links
Death Before Dishonor XV at ROHWrestling.com

Professional wrestling shows in the Las Vegas Valley
2017 in Nevada
Events in Sunrise Manor, Nevada
15
2017 Ring of Honor pay-per-view events